Wendell Reid Corey (March 20, 1914 – November 8, 1968) was an American actor and politician. He was President of the Academy of Motion Picture Arts and Sciences and was a board member of the Screen Actors Guild.

Biography

Early years
Corey was born in Dracut, Massachusetts, the son of Milton Rothwell Corey (October 24, 1879 – October 23, 1951) and Julia Etta McKenney (April 11, 1882 – June 16, 1947). His father was a Congregationalist clergyman and an actor who appeared in Rawhide as Dr Tucker. Wendell was educated in Springfield, Massachusetts. His ancestors included U.S. Presidents John Adams and John Quincy Adams.

Before becoming an actor, Corey was a washing-machine salesman in a department store.

Stage
Corey "began acting in 1938 with the depression-spawned Federal Theatre Project".

Most of these had short runs. Corey had his first hit as a cynical newspaperman in Elmer Rice's comedy Dream Girl (1945). While appearing in the play, Corey was seen by producer Hal Wallis, who persuaded him to sign a contract with Paramount and pursue a motion picture career in Hollywood.

Film
After appearing in a U.S. Army short film on venereal disease entitled Easy to Get in 1947, Corey's feature film debut came as a gangster in Wallis's Desert Fury (1947) starring Burt Lancaster, John Hodiak, Lizabeth Scott, and Mary Astor. In 1947 he appeared in The Voice of the Turtle on stage with Margaret Sullavan in England.

Wallis promoted him to co-star status in The File on Thelma Jordon (1950) where he appeared opposite Barbara Stanwyck. Corey had a good part in Columbia's No Sad Songs for Me (1950) playing Margaret Sullavan's husband.

He co-starred with Lana Turner in A Life of Her Own but pulled out after only a few days claiming he was miscast. He was replaced by Ray Milland.

Corey had one of his most memorable roles when he played Lt. Thomas Doyle in Hitchcock's Rear Window (1954) starring James Stewart and Grace Kelly. He toured the US on stage in The Caine Mutiny Court Martial in 1954.

Television

Corey portrayed Lou Gehrig in "The Lou Gehrig Story" for the television series Climax! (1955). He was a series lead in Harbor Command (1957–1958) for which Corey starred with Casey Walters.

Other activities
Corey was President of the Academy of Motion Picture Arts and Sciences from 1961 to 1963 and was a member of the board of directors of the Screen Actors Guild. A Republican campaigner in national politics since 1956, Corey was elected to the Santa Monica City Council in April 1965.

Corey supported Barry Goldwater in the 1964 United States presidential election.

Death
Corey died November 8, 1968, at age 54 at the Motion Picture & Television Hospital in Woodland Hills, California, of cirrhosis of the liver as a result of alcoholism. Funeral services were held at First Presbyterian Church in Santa Monica, California.

Walk of Fame
Wendell Corey has a star on the Hollywood Walk of Fame awarded for his work in TV, at 6328 Hollywood Boulevard in Hollywood, Los Angeles.

Filmography

Radio appearances

References

External links

 
 
 
 

1914 births
1968 deaths
20th-century American male actors
20th-century American politicians
Alcohol-related deaths in California
American Congregationalists
American male film actors
American male stage actors
American male television actors
Burials in Massachusetts
California city council members
California Republicans
Deaths from cirrhosis
Male actors from Massachusetts
People from Dracut, Massachusetts
Presidents of the Academy of Motion Picture Arts and Sciences
Federal Theatre Project people